Hero - Sa Re Ga Ma Pa 2012 was the fifth instalment of the Sa Re Ga Ma Pa Challenge series. It premiered on 29 September 2012 on Zee TV. The show was hosted by popular singer Javed Ali.

Overview
Over 1,20,000 auditions were conducted in New Delhi, Mumbai and Kolkata to select 100 contestants. Out of these, the top fifteen then competed for a position in the top ten for five weeks, two contestants being eliminated each week for three weeks, and one each for weeks 4 and 5. In the fifth week, three of the eliminated contestants won back their positions in the top ten by defeating three other contenders, to make up the final list of top ten.

The top ten then went on to compete in a contest to be decided by viewers through voting. This segment witnessed one elimination every week, until four contestants were left. The winner amongst them was announced in a Grand Finale episode. The contest was won by Jasraj Joshi, with the second, third and fourth places going to Shehnaz Akhtar, Vishwajeet Borwankar and Mohammed Aman respectively.

Hosts
 Javed Ali
 Jay Bhanushali (Audition episodes)

Judges and Mentors
 Rahul Ram
 Shankar Mahadevan
 Sajid–Wajid

Guest Judges
 Prasoon Joshi (Week 11)
 Ajay–Atul (Week 11)
 Ustad Ghulam Ali (Week 7)
 Taufiq Qureshi (Week 6)
 Pandit Vishwa Mohan Bhatt (Week 5)
 Hariharan (Week 4)
 Gurdas Maan (Week 3)
 Begum Parveen Sultana (Week 2)
 Pandit Jasraj (Week 1)

Promotional Guest Appearances
 Sudhir Mishra, Arjun Rampal, Chitrangada Singh (Inkaar) - Week 12
 Vishal Bhardwaj, Rekha Bhardwaj, Imran Khan, Anushka Sharma (Matru Ki Bijlee Ka Mandola) - Week 10
 Salman Khan, Sonakshi Sinha (Dabangg 2) - Week 8
 Shah Rukh Khan, Katrina Kaif, Anushka Sharma (Jab Tak Hai Jaan) - Week 3
 Ajay Devgn, Sonakshi Sinha (Son of Sardaar) - Week 3
 Preity Zinta (Ishkq in Paris) - Week 1
 Promos were made showing that [Akshay Kumar] and [Kajal Agarwal] would be there to promote Special 26 in the grand finale, but for an unknown reason they did not show up.

Contestants

Finalists
 Jasraj Joshi (Pune) - Winner
 Shehnaz Akhtar (Punjab) - Second place
 Vishwajeet Borwankar (Mumbai) - Third place
 Mohammed Aman (Rajasthan..) - Fourth place
(Eliminated in Week 3; successful attempt during wild-card entry episode)

Eliminated
 Jaspreet 'Jazim' Sharma (Punjab) - in Week 13
 Renu Nagar (Rajasthan) - in Week 11
 Arshpreet Kaur (Punjab) - in Week 10 (previously eliminated in Week 4; successful attempt during wild-card entry episode)
 Madhuri Dey (Kolkata, West Bengal) - in Week 9
 Himanshu Sharma (Jagadhri, Haryana) - in Week 8 (previously eliminated in Mega Audition; successful attempt during wild-card entry episode)
 Zain Ali (Lahore, Pakistan) - in Week 7 (beginning of public voting)
 Barbie Rajput (Chandigarh) - in Mega Audition (unsuccessful attempt during wild-card entry episode)
 Padmanav Bordoloi (Guwahati, Assam) - in Week 5 (unsuccessful attempt during wild-card entry episode)
 Kunal Pandit (Mumbai, Maharashtra) - in Week 3 (unsuccessful attempt during wild-card entry episode)
 Mrunmayee Tirodkar (Goa) - in Week 2
 Subhrima Bhadury (Mumbai, Maharashtra) - in Week 2
 Parul Mishra (Gorakhpur, Uttar Pradesh) - in Week 1
 Arsh Mohammed (Mumbai, Maharashtra) - in Week 1

References

External links
 Official website
 Saregamapa Facebook Page
 Saregamapa Twitter Page
 

Sa Re Ga Ma Pa
2012 Indian television seasons